Girl in Danger is a 1934 American crime film directed by D. Ross Lederman and starring Ralph Bellamy, Shirley Grey and Arthur Hohl. Produced and distributed by Columbia Pictures, it was the fourth and final entry in a series featuring Bellamy as NYPD Inspector Steve Trent. The three previous films were Before Midnight, One Is Guilty and The Crime of Helen Stanley.

Cast
 Ralph Bellamy as Inspector Steve Trent
 Shirley Grey as Gloria Gale
 Arthur Hohl as Albert Beckett
 Charles Sabin as Daniel S. Terrence
 J. Carrol Naish as Mike Russo (as Carrol Naish)
 Ward Bond as Wynkoski
 Edward LeSaint as Chief O'Brien (as Ed Le Saint)
 Vincent Sherman as Willie Tolini
 Edward Keane as Thornton

References

Bibliography
 Backer, Ron. Mystery Movie Series of 1930s Hollywood. McFarland, 2012.

External links
 

1934 films
1934 crime films
American crime films
American black-and-white films
1930s English-language films
Films directed by D. Ross Lederman
Columbia Pictures films
1930s American films